New Riverdale is the title used to refer to the relaunch of the core Archie Comics titles that began in July 2015.

In December 2014, Archie Comics announced that its flagship series Archie would relaunch with a new first issue in July 2015. The new series would be a modern take on the Archie characters by writer Mark Waid and artist Fiona Staples, featuring serialized storylines. After the first three issues, Annie Wu drew an issue, followed by new regular artist Veronica Fish. The new title received IGN's "Best New Comic Series of 2015" award.

In 2016 Archie Comics made a special edition of the first issue of the New Riverdale Archie series available as part of Free Comic Book Day. For FCBD 2017, a special edition of the first issue of Betty and Veronica was released.

Titles
The first title in the company's "New Riverdale" universe, Archie was released with a July 2015 cover date and came in at #7 for comic book sales for the month. The next title, Jughead, was released in October. In April 2015, Archie Comics announced Betty and Veronica which debuted in July 2016. Josie and the Pussycats, and Reggie and Me, a five-issue miniseries, followed in September and December 2016.

Early issues of Archie and Jughead included reprints of early original stories featuring the characters, introduced by the series' contemporary writer. Later issues had material relating to the Riverdale TV show instead. Each issue typically has several variant covers.

Titles
 Archie vol. 2 (July 2015– October 2020)
 Jughead (October 2015– October 2017)
 Reggie and Me (May 2016– October 2017)
 Betty and Veronica vol. 4 (July 2016 – June 2017)
 The Archies (October 2017–2018)

Past titles and specials
 Betty and Veronica: Vixens (November 2017–September 2018)
 Jughead vol. 3 #1–16 (October 2015–June 2017)
 Betty and Veronica vol. 3 #1–3 (July 2016–June 2017)
 Josie and the Pussycats vol. 2 #1–9 (September 2016–August 2017)
 Reggie and Me vol. 2 #1–5 (December 2016–May 2017)
 Big Moose Double Sized One Shot (April 2017)
 The Archies Double Sized One Shot (May 2017)

Collected editions
Each of the ongoing series is currently being collected into trade paperbacks. Each volume collects one arc of the series, and usually includes extra material like artist's sketches, as well as one issue of an additional New Riverdale series. In addition, four volumes are scheduled to be released under the 'Road to Riverdale' banner. They collect the first, second, third, and fourth issues of the main series respectively, and are targeted at readers coming to the comics from The CW series Riverdale.

Archie

Jughead

Josie and the Pussycats

Reggie and Me

Betty and Veronica

Road to Riverdale

The Archies and Other Stories

References 

Archie Comics
2015 comics debuts